XHEZZZ-FM is a radio station on 99.5 FM in Tapachula, Chiapas. XHEZZZ carries the Los 40 format from Televisa Radio.

History
XHEZZZ began as a proposal for XEZY-AM 1380, located in Ciudad Hidalgo, Chiapas, a station and frequency made available in 1970. However, the station was built in Tapachula on 590 kHz with the XEZZZ-AM calls in 1996 by Miguel Galindo Amador.

The concession was sold in 2007.

References

Radio stations in Chiapas